Richard Blackwell (by 1517–1568) was an English politician.

He was a Member (MP) of the Parliament of England for Derbyshire in 1545 and October 1553.

References

1568 deaths
Year of birth uncertain
English MPs 1545–1547
English MPs 1553 (Mary I)